Joysound Dive (Japanese: ジョイサウンドダイブ, Hepburn: Joisaundo daibu) was a PlayStation 3 video game developed by  and published by Bandai Namco Games, exclusively released in Japan on November 23, 2011. It was region locked, with no plans for an international release, being one of only two PlayStation 3 games to enforce region locking (the other being Persona 4 Arena). It was shut down and removed from the PlayStation Store on October 31, 2014.

References

2011 video games
PlayStation 3 games
PlayStation 3-only games
PlayStation Network games
Sony Interactive Entertainment games
Video games developed in Japan
Region-locked PlayStation 3 games
Japan-exclusive video games